Tubulin gamma-2 chain is a protein that in humans is encoded by the TUBG2 gene.

References

Further reading